Takushoku University (拓殖 大学; Takushoku Daigaku, abbreviated as 拓大 Takudai) is a private university in Tokyo, Japan. It was founded in 1900 by Duke Taro Katsura (1848–1913). It has two campuses: the main campus in the Bunkyō Ward and a satellite campus in Hachiōji. Takushoku University has five faculties: Commerce, Political Science and Economics, Foreign Languages, International Studies, and Engineering.

Takushoku University is a leading university of security studies in Japan. The current chancellor is a former Minister of Defense, Satoshi Morimoto. Past chancellors include former prime ministers, such as Taro Katsura and Yasuhiro Nakasone.

History
Originally, Takushoku University was named the Taiwan Association School, and was founded to produce graduates to contribute to the development of Taiwan. In 1907, it was renamed as the Oriental Association Vocational School. In 1918, it adopted its present name of Takushoku University. Literally, "Takushoku" means "development and industrialization" as well as "colonization", because Japan had overseas colonies like Taiwan, South Sakhalin, and Korea to industrialize at that time.

Takashoku University was the second best university in Japan, after Tokyo University, until the end of World War II. After the war, the university was dissolved by the Supreme Commander for the Allied Powers due to its strong support for militarism. It was then renamed as Kōryō University (紅陵大学; Kōryō Daigaku) but has managed to change it back to its original name in 1952.

Notable facts
 Takushoku University is a leading university of national security in Japan.
 The current chancellor is a former Minister of Defense, Satoshi Morimoto. Past chancellors include former prime ministers, such as Taro Katsura and Yasuhiro Nakasone.
 Takushoku University is the only university in Japan to be home to a think tank (the Institute of World Studies) for international relations and security.
 Margaret Thatcher received her honorary doctorate degree at this university.
 The Faculty of Political Science and Economics is the third oldest in the country after Waseda and Meiji universities.

Organization

Faculties

Graduate schools

Sports
Takushoku University was responsible for training many of Japanese local and colonial administrators as well as overseas merchants. Several of these people who were karateka (practitioners of karate) took up administrative positions in the Japan Karate Association when it was founded in 1949. The university's karate club was founded around 1924 and has produced many prominent karate instructors and competitors. The university also has a judo program, which produced a second-place result in a 1967 Japanese collegiate competition.
Athletics club was founded in 1921. It has participated in the Hakone Ekiden 42 times until 2021.

Alumni

See also

References

External links
  
 Takushoku University Karate Club 
 Commemorative Photo-book 拓殖大学創立百周年記念写真集「雄飛」（2002年 3月30日発行） 

Educational institutions established in 1900
Private universities and colleges in Japan
1900 establishments in Japan
Takushoku University
American football in Japan